Tony Lynn Mack (born April 30, 1961) is an American former professional baseball player.

Mack attended Tates Creek High School in Lexington, Kentucky. As a junior in 1978, then standing only , Mack won the semifinal and championship of the Kentucky high school baseball state championship and was named the tournament's most valuable player. With poor grades and following a senior slump, according to a 1982 article in the Lexington Herald-Leader, Mack had "to scrounge for" an opportunity to play college baseball for the Lamar University Cardinals. However, according to a 1985 article in the same newspaper, he had several competing scholarship offers but ultimately decided to attend Lamar "because it was in the South" and he knew that was where he needed to go if he was "serious about baseball."

At Lamar, Mack was named to the All-Southland Conference Team in 1981 and 1982, won a conference championship in 1981 and threw a no-hitter against McNeese State.

On the advice of Lamar coach Lou Smith, the California Angels selected Mack in the third round of the 1982 Major League Baseball draft. In 1985, in the middle of a pennant race with the Angels low on pitching, Mack was called up to the majors. He would appear in just one Major League Baseball game for the Angels on July 27. Shortly thereafter, the Angels acquired veteran pitchers John Candelaria and Al Holland and Mack's services were no longer required. He was sent back down to the minors but felt he had learned from his brief stint in the majors that he could get Major League hitters out and that he "could play with them."

In 1981 he won a gold medal as a member of the United States national team in the 1981 World Games.

References

External links
 

1961 births
Living people
African-American baseball players
Alexandria Aces players
American expatriate baseball players in Canada
Baseball players from Lexington, Kentucky
California Angels players
Columbus Astros players
Corpus Christi Barracudas players
Competitors at the 1981 World Games
Edmonton Trappers players
Lamar Cardinals baseball players
Major League Baseball pitchers
Miami Miracle players
Midland Angels players
Redwood Pioneers players
Salem Angels players
San Antonio Missions players
Tucson Toros players
Vancouver Canadians players
Waterbury Angels players
World Games gold medalists
21st-century African-American people
20th-century African-American sportspeople
Industriales de Monterrey players
Tigres de Quintana Roo players
Algodoneros de Unión Laguna players
American expatriate baseball players in Mexico